Bruno Max Wilhelm Petermann (1898-1941) was a German psychology professor who published one of the early textbooks on Gestalt theory.

Life 
Petermann was born on 15 March 1898 in Kiel. He took a doctorate in the University of Kiel in 1921. He taught in Dortmund, Kiel and Altona and then became a professor at the Hamburg teacher training college from 1936 to 1939. Whilst at Hamburg Petermann spent time teaching in Shanghai.

Petermann became a member of the Nazi party in 1937 and in 1939 was made Professor of Psychology and Education in the University of Göttingen.

Petermann died on 11 February 1941 in Hamburg.

Works 

 Das Gestaltproblem in der Psychologie im Lichte analytischer Besinnung, 1931. Barth, Leipzig. Translated into English as:
 The Gestalt Theory and the Problem of Configuration,1932.  Translated by Meyer Fortes. The International Library of Psychology, Philosophy, and Scientific Method. Kegan Paul, London.
 Trigonometry, 1938. Diesterweg, Frankfurt.

Biography 

 Deutsches biographisches Archiv  II 994, 444; III 696, 187.

References 

1898 births
1941 deaths
German psychologists
20th-century psychologists
University of Kiel alumni
Academic staff of the University of Göttingen
Nazi Party members